Rizk is a surname. Notable people with the surname include:

Amina Rizk (Arabic: أمينة رزق) (1910–2003), classic Egyptian actress
Charles Rizk (Arabic: شارل رزق), (born 1935), Lebanese Maronite politician
Georgina Rizk (Arabic: جورجينا رزق), Lebanon's first and so far only Miss Universe
Milad Rizk, Lebanese actor
Caroline Rizk, Famed Indiana State Manager